Trechus albanicus is a species of ground beetle in the subfamily Trechinae. It was described by Apfelbeck in 1907.

References

albanicus
Beetles described in 1907